Daniel Mrázek (born 15 May 2003) is a Czech ice dancer. With his sister and skating partner, Kateřina Mrázková, he is the 2023 World Junior champion, the 2022–23 Junior Grand Prix Final bronze medalist, a two-time ISU Junior Grand Prix gold medalist, the 2023 Czech junior national champion, and holds the junior world record for the rhythm dance and combined total.

Personal life 
Mrázek was born on 15 May 2003 in Nymburk, Czech Republic.

Career

Early career
As a singles skater, Mrázek appeared twice on the Junior Grand Prix and won the bronze medal at the 2018 Czech junior national championships. In his final season of competition, he was part of the Czech team for the 2020 Winter Youth Olympics, finishing eleventh in the boys' event. He won the silver medal at the Christmas Cup, his lone senior international appearance. Following the end of the season, he switched his focus to ice dance and partnered with his younger sister Kateřina.

Mrázková/Mrázek made their competitive debut internationally at the Egna Dance Trophy at the end of the 2020–21 season, finishing in ninth place. The following season saw them make their ISU Junior Grand Prix debut, finishing both at both the first French JGP in Courchevel and the 2022 JGP Slovakia in Košice. Silver medalists at the Ice Challenge in the junior category, and then taking gold at the Pavel Roman Memorial, they were only the silver medalists at the Czech Junior Championships. As a result, they were not assigned to compete at the 2022 World Junior Championships but went on to win the gold medal at the Egna Trophy in their second appearance there.

2022–23 season
Mrázková/Mrázek opened their season at the 2022 JGP Czech Republic on home soil in Ostrava. In the rhythm dance, they set a new junior world record, breaking a three-year-old record set by 2019 World Junior champions Lajoie/Lagha. They went on to win the gold medal, the first ever for a Czech junior dance team. Mrázek observed that "in 2018, I was here in the same Junior Grand Prix as a single skater, and I finished, like, fifteenth. Today I'm here with my sister, my partner. We achieved something we didn't believe in four years." The 2022 JGP Italy, their second assignment, was held at their training base in Egna. Mrázková/Mrázek improved upon their previous junior world record in the rhythm dance by over a point and led the segment going into the free dance. The siblings maintained their lead in the free to take the title by a nearly 15-point margin over silver medalists Lim/Quan of South Korea. Due to their placements across their two JGP assignments, Mrázková/Mrázek qualified to the 2022–23 Junior Grand Prix Final as the top-seeded junior dance team. They are the first Czech team to qualify for the Final since Kadlčáková/Bílek in 2000.

Mrázková/Mrázek entered the Junior Grand Prix Final in Torino as the favourites for the gold medal but placed fourth in the rhythm dance after both fell at the end of their Argentine tango pattern dance segment. The siblings opened their free dance with another double-fall on their rotational lift. Despite this, they still placed third in that segment and rose to third overall, 0.99 points behind silver medalists Lim/Quan. She remarked on winning the bronze medal, "we were not so happy because we made some mistakes." Assessing the situation afterward, they attributed the initial fall in the rhythm dance to Mrázek tripping on Mrázková's calf-length skirt, a costuming choice they had made at the start of the season specifically to acquire a different look than the typical dance program. The siblings also said they were nervous in the face of the best possible junior competition, some of whom, such as the eventual gold medalist Canadian team Bashynska/Beaumont, they had never met before.

Shortly after their disappointment in Turin, Mrázková/Mrázek appeared at the 2023 Four National Championships, finishing first overall among junior ice dance teams and winning the Czech junior national title. In the new year, they won gold at the Egna Dance Trophy in February.

At the 2023 World Junior Championships in Calgary, Mrázková/Mrázek placed first in the rhythm dance, 0.11 points clear of Lim/Quan in second place, while expected rivals Bashynska/Beaumont finished fourth in the segment due to errors on the pattern. The siblings' lone error was her missing a twizzle level. They went on to win the free skate as well by a wider margin over the South Koreans, becoming the first Czech dance team to win the Junior World title. He said they were "incredibly happy" at the outcome after the problems in Turin, also indicating that they planned to compete at the senior level the following season.

Programs

With Mrázková

Records and achievements

Junior world record scores 
Mrázková/Mrázek are the current junior world record holders for the rhythm dance and total scores.

Achievements 
With Mrázek for Czech Republic:
 First Czech ice dance team to win Junior World Championships.
 Second Czech junior ice dance team to qualify for Junior Grand Prix Final, behind Lucie Kadlčáková / Hynek Bílek.
 First Czech ice dance team to win a Junior Grand Prix event.

Competitive highlights 
JGP: Junior Grand Prix

Ice dance with Mrázková

Men's singles

Detailed results 
Small medals for short and free programs awarded only at ISU Championships.

With Mrázková

References

External links 
 

! colspan="3" style="border-top: 5px solid #78FF78;" |World Junior Record Holders

2003 births
Living people
Czech male ice dancers
People from Nymburk
Figure skaters at the 2020 Winter Youth Olympics